Malik Sellouki (born 21 March 2000) is a French professional footballer who plays as a midfielder for Eerste Divisie side ADO Den Haag.

Career
Sellouki began his career with the amateur side Cannes, and signed with Nice on 26 August 2020. He made his professional debut with Nice in a 3–2 Ligue 1 defeat to Marseille on 17 February 2021, scoring his side's second goal in the 87th minute.

On 25 August 2021, Sellouki signed a two-year contract with Slovenian side Maribor. After making 17 appearances in all competitions during the 2021–22 season, he terminated his contract in July 2022 and joined Eerste Divisie side ADO Den Haag on a two-year deal.

Personal life
Born in France, Sellouki is of Moroccan descent.

References

External links
 

2000 births
Living people
Footballers from Nice
French footballers
French expatriate footballers
French sportspeople of Moroccan descent
Association football midfielders
Association football wingers
AS Cannes players
OGC Nice players
NK Maribor players
ADO Den Haag players
Championnat National 3 players
Ligue 1 players
Slovenian PrvaLiga players
Eerste Divisie players
French expatriate sportspeople in Slovenia
Expatriate footballers in Slovenia
French expatriate sportspeople in the Netherlands
Expatriate footballers in the Netherlands